Classified: The Edward Snowden Story was a 2014 feature film by Jason Bourque and Travis Doering starring Kevin Zegers, Michael Shanks and Carmen Aguirre.

Plot
Classified: The Edward Snowden Story told the story of Edward Snowden starting from the time he enlisted in the US army. In this 2 hour feature, they explore the events leading up to the release of classified information on the National Security Agency's various surveillance programs.

Cast
 Kevin Zegers as Edward Snowden
 Michael Shanks as Glenn Greenwald
 Carmen Aguirre as Laura Poitras

Funding & Cancellation
Classified: The Edward Snowden Story was financed via crowdfunding on the popular website Kickstarter and was scheduled to be released under the creative commons licence for free on September 19, 2014 via The Pirate Bay. In January 2014 the producers announced that "Classified" would be split into two separate projects one titled "Vulnerability", a documentary that focuses on IT security and the internet. The second, a feature film based on Snowden's life that would be produced in cooperation with likeminded production companies and film distributors in the near future. In January 2014 existing backers from "Classified" had the option to transfer their donations to "Vulnerability" or have the funds fully refunded. "Vulnerability" began filming in Vancouver, British Columbia on March 10, 2014.

References

External links
Vulnerability at the Internet Movie Database
Softpedia Interview - Producer Travis Doering - September 2013
CTV Interview - Jason Bourque, Travis Doering - September 2013
CNBC Interview - Jason Bourque, Travis Doering - September 2013

2014 television films
2014 films
Canadian drama television films
Cultural depictions of Edward Snowden
English-language Canadian films
Films about security and surveillance
Films directed by Jason Bourque
2010s Canadian films